Benjamin Owusu (July 20, 1989 – November 10, 2010 in Accra) was a Ghanaian footballer.

Career
Owusu began his career with Berekum Arsenal and joined the primavera team from Brescia, who earned his first professional match in the Serie B on 21 October 2008 against Rimini. On 24 July 2009 he was linked with a possible move to Scafatese, he signed not a contract and turned back to the primavera team of Brescia. He died in 2010.

References

1989 births
Footballers from Accra
Ghanaian footballers
Association football defenders
Ghanaian expatriate footballers
Expatriate footballers in Italy
Serie B players
Ghanaian expatriate sportspeople in Italy
Berekum Arsenal players
2010 deaths